Oakville is a city in southeasern Louisa County, Iowa, United States. The population was 200 at the time of the 2020 census. It is part of the Muscatine Micropolitan Statistical Area.

History
Oakville was laid out in 1891.

Geography
Oakville is located just north of Iowa Route X99 and the Iowa River passes about one-half mile to the northwest. The Louisa-Des Moines county line is two miles to the south. Wapello is about six miles to the northwest and Keithsburg, Illinois is across the Mississippi River approximately five mile to the east.

Demographics

2010 census
At the 2010 census there were 173 people in 62 households, including 42 families, in the city. The racial makup of the city was 97.7% White, 0.6% from other races, and 1.7% from two or more races. Hispanic or Latino of any race were 2.9%.

Of the 62 households 41.9% had children under the age of 18 living with them, 40.3% were married couples living together, 14.5% had a female householder with no husband present, 12.9% had a male householder with no wife present, and 32.3% were non-families. 29.0% of households were one person and 12.9% were one person aged 65 or older. The average household size was 2.79 and the average family size was 3.36.

The median age was 28.3 years. 37% of residents were under the age of 18; 8.6% were between the ages of 18 and 24; 24.9% were from 25 to 44; 20.3% were from 45 to 64; and 9.2% were 65 or older. The gender makeup of the city was 51.4% male and 48.6% female.

2000 census
At the 2000 census there were 439 people in 179 households, including 119 families, in the city. The racial makup of the city was 99.32% White, 0.46% Asian, and 0.23% from two or more races. Hispanic or Latino of any race were 0.91%.

Of the 179 households 33.0% had children under the age of 18 living with them, 49.2% were married couples living together, 12.3% had a female householder with no husband present, and 33.5% were non-families. 28.5% of households were one person and 12.3% were one person aged 65 or older. The average household size was 2.45 and the average family size was 2.97.

The age distribution was 26.9% under the age of 18, 8.0% from 18 to 24, 28.0% from 25 to 44, 22.6% from 45 to 64, and 14.6% 65 or older. The median age was 34 years. For every 100 females, there were 99.5 males. For every 100 females age 18 and over, there were 89.9 males.

The median household income was $29,018 and the median family income  was $32,250. Males had a median income of $31,346 versus $21,389 for females. The per capita income for the city was $13,276. About 3.0% of families and 7.7% of the population were below the poverty line, including 8.8% of those under age 18 and 6.1% of those age 65 or over.

Education
The Wapello Community School District operates area public schools.

June 2008 flooding

Due to the catastrophic statewide major flooding of June 2008, the recovery of the city is under question.

References

Cities in Louisa County, Iowa
Cities in Iowa
Muscatine, Iowa micropolitan area